The Save is a 144 km long river in southern France, left tributary of the Garonne. Its source is in the northern foothills of the Pyrenees, south of Lannemezan. It flows north-east through the following départements and cities:
 Hautes-Pyrénées. 
 Haute-Garonne: Grenade, L'Isle-en-Dodon. 
 Gers: L'Isle-Jourdain.

It flows into the Garonne in Grenade, north of Toulouse.

Among its tributaries is the Gesse.

References

Rivers of France
Rivers of Gers
Rivers of Haute-Garonne
Rivers of Hautes-Pyrénées
Rivers of Occitania (administrative region)